Jane Wodening (born Mary Jane Collom in 1936) is an American artist and writer. She is best known for her collaborations with experimental filmmaker Stan Brakhage, to whom she was married from 1957 until 1987. During this period, she was known as Jane Brakhage. Wodening featured in Brakhage's short film Window Water Baby Moving, in which her husband filmed her giving birth. 

Wodening holds many environmentalists views due to her love of nature. Both during and after her marriage to Brakhage, she has frequently grown her own food and lived with animals she takes care of and looks after.

Life and career 
Wodening grew up with her brother Jack Collom in Western Springs, Illinois. She married Stan Brakhage in 1957. Before marrying Brakhage, she was studying to be a zoologist. On her reason for dropping out, Wodening said:I quit school because I was unpopular. I was not the norm, even though I really tried. I wore the right clothes, and I washed myself, I took baths and shaved my armpits, and—oh! The things I did. But it didn't work, none of it worked. I was just weird. I didn't say the right things, I didn't look in the right direction. Out of it, I've always been out of it.During their marriage, she was featured in one of Brakhage's best-known works, the experimental short film Window Water Baby Moving. In the film, her husband films her giving birth. Critic Archer Winsten described the film as being "so forthright, so full of primitive wonder and love, so far beyond civilization in its acceptance that it becomes an experience like few in the history of movies." The Academy Film Archive preserved Window Water Baby Moving in 2013.

She later featured in another "birth film" filmed by Brakhage, called Thigh Line Lyre Triangular (1961), though this film was less critically acclaimed. Wodening is also featured in several other acclaimed works, many of which she played a significant role in the actual making of (directing, photographing, and editing), such as Cats Cradle (1959), Wedlock House: An Intercourse (1959), and Dog Star Man (1961-64).

Brakhage and Wodening have both stated that she played a large role in Brakhage's career. In an interview once, Brakhage is quoted as having said, "'By Brakhage' should be understood to mean 'by way of Stan and Jane Brakhage,' as it does in all my films since marriage. It is coming to mean: 'by way of Stan and Jane and all the children Brakhage.'" Wodening has reiterated this as well saying: And so, this point of contention about, was I a partner in Stan's work. Stan said so, over and over again, from the stage. And that's interesting. . . . So, I'll see what I can say, but what I'm speaking from is: I was working on the films.While Wodening was married to Brakhage, experimental filmaker and feminist Barbara Hammer made a short documentary about her titled Jane Brakhage. Released in 1974, the film takes an intimate look at her life and features prominent voice-over of Wodening discussing her views on life, nature, philosophy, and being a housewife. Interestingly, in order to more directly focus on Wodening's life, Hammer chose not to include any footage, or mention, of Brakhage (whose work she admired) in the documentary. Initially the film was meant to act as Hammer's masters thesis film for San Francisco State University but it was rejected.

After almost 30 years of marriage, Brakhage separated from Wodening in 1986, and the divorce was finalized a year later. She subsequently lived in her car for two years and drove all over America, creating the book Driveabout. Later, she lived alone in a tiny cabin at 10,000 feet elevation in the Rocky Mountains, creating another book Living Up There while getting out several collections of short stories.

In 2004, she moved to Denver, Colorado and continued writing books, such as Wolf Dictionary, The Lady Orangutan and Other Stories,  Animals I've Neglected to Mention, and Brakhage’s Childhood.

Scrapbooks

In the mid to late 1960s, Wodening made a set of three large scrapbooks that include many of the poets and artists of the time who frequented Brakhage's and her house when they were married. They chronicle Wodening and her family's life during this time period and include material such as newspaper clippings, photos, drawings by both her children and the artists that visited their house, letters from the artists they kept correspondence with (including such figures as Robert Creeley, Edward Dorn, Robert Kelly, and Joseph Cornell), effectations from daily life, and even frames from Brakhage's Mothlight.  These are now in the Beinecke Rare Book and Manuscript Library at Yale University. They have since been made accessible online.

Bibliography 
• Animals I've Neglected to Mention - Sockwood Press, Nederland, CO 80466, 2019

• Driveabout - Sockwood Press, Nederland, CO 80466, 2016

• Wolf Dictionary - Sockwood Press, Nederland, CO 80466, 2016

• Brakhage's Childhood - Granary Books, New York, NY 2016

• The Lady Orangutan and Other Stories - Sockwood Press, Nederland, CO  2014

• Living Up There - Foreword by Reed Bye - Baksun Books, Boulder, CO  2009

• Egypt and Me - Introduction by Jennifer Heath, design by Sarah Bell - Baksun Books, Boulder, CO  2012

• First Presence - Introduction by Merill Gilfillan - Baksun Books, Boulder, CO  2000

• Mountain Woman Tales - illustrated by Betsy Buck - Grackle Books, Nederland, CO  1994

second edition Mountain Woman Tales and Bird Journal, 1967 - Baksun Books, Boulder  CO   2000

• Book of Gargoyles - preface by Lucia Berlin - Baksun Books, Boulder, CO  1999

• Moon Songs - situations press, New York, NY  1997

• The Inside Story - Baksun Books in collaboration with Rodent Press, Boulder, CO  1996

• From the Book of Legends - 100 copies made - Granary Books, New York, NY 1989

second edition, preface by Robert Creeley  - Invisible Books, London, UK 1993

• Lump Gulch Tales - Grackle Books, Nederland, CO  1993

second edition - Baksun Books, Boulder, CO 1993

Filmography 

 Cats Cradle 
 Window Water Baby Moving
 Wedlock House: An Intercourse 
 Dog Star Man 
 Songs 
 Scenes from Under Childhood
 The Machine of Eden
 Star Garden

References

American short story writers
Living people
1936 births